Antonio Vico Pinto (3 December 1840 - 8 March 1940) was a Spanish stage actor.

Family provenance
Antonio Vico Pinto was born into a family of thespians at Jerez de la Frontera in the extreme southwest of Spain.   His father was the actor Antonio Vico y López de Adrián.   In 2015 his descendants continue to contribute actively to the world of theatre in Spain.

An early mentor was the actor , from whom he learned some of the "heartthrob" roles, until 1864 which was when Antonio Vico switched to the  Victorino Tamayo theatre company.

Calvo and Vico played key roles in the revival of the theatre in Madrid, supported by the friendship of dramatists such as Galdós, Echegaray, Cano and Sellés.   Another admirer was a youthful Antonio Machado.   During this period Vico starred in productions of "En el puño de la espada", "La muerte en los labios", "Cid Rodrigo de Vivar", "La Pasionaria", "Otelo", "Vida alegre y muerte triste" and, again in association with Calvo, El gran Galeoto.

From 1882 Vico taught at the Royal Academy of Dramatic Arts in Madrid.  His autobiography, replete with numerous personal theatrical anecdotes, was published in 1902.

Antonio Vico died at Nuevitas during a theatre tour in Latin America and his body was buried locally.   Later, however, his remains were returned to Spain for burial at the Cementerio de San Justo at Madrid.

References

People from Jerez de la Frontera
19th-century Spanish male actors
1840 births
1902 deaths